Loroum is one of the 45 provinces of Burkina Faso, located in its Nord Region. Its capital is Titao.

Education
In 2011 the province had 192 primary schools and 12 secondary schools.

Healthcare
In 2011 the province had 20 health and social promotion centers (Centres de santé et de promotion sociale), 3 doctors and 52 nurses.

Departments
Loroum is divided into 4 departments:

See also
Regions of Burkina Faso
Provinces of Burkina Faso
Departments of Burkina Faso

References

 
Provinces of Burkina Faso